Wastelands is the sixth studio album by Australian rock band Eskimo Joe, released on 20 September 2013.

Track listing

Personnel 
 Kavyen Temperley – vocals, bass, keyboards
 Stuart MacLeod – guitar, vocals
 Joel Quartermain – guitar, drums, vocals

Charts

Release history

References 

2013 albums
Eskimo Joe albums